Leonardo Morlino (born 1947) is Emeritus Professor of Political Science at LUISS "Guido Carli" University (Rome, Italy) specializing in comparative politics.

He has been the first Italian President of the International Political Science Association from 2009 until 2012.

Previously to being professor at LUISS, he has been professor of Political Science at the University of Florence (Italy) from 1971 until 2006. He also served also as Vice Rector (Research) of LUISS "Guido Carli" University from 2012 to 2018.

He has been visiting professor at, among others, Stanford University (Palo Alto, USA), the Institut d’Etudes Politiques (Paris, France), the Centro de Estudios Politicos y Constitucionales (Madrid, Spain), the Juan March Institute (Madrid, Spain), New York University (Florence Overseas Study Program), and fellow at Nuffield College (Oxford University, UK), Yale University (New Haven, USA), Stanford University (Palo Alto, USA).

He wrote extensively on the changes of political regimes, democratization processes and the quality of democracy of different areas of the world.

The theory of anchoring
Morlino developed the theory of anchoring to understand how and why there can be democratic consolidation or democratic crisis, the processes of legitimation and of anchoring should be carefully explored. The key proposition is that to achieve consolidation with a limited legitimation strong anchors are needed. The main anchoring mechanisms we can empirically find are: party organization, clientelism, neo-corporatist arrangements, and party control of interests. Other possible anchors include: a strong leader, a successful tv channel, an internet networking skillfully managed. Likewise, there is an internal crisis of democracy when for a number of different reason the existing anchors fade away, i.e. there is a de-anchoring. In case of crisis this phenomenon is usually compounded by delegitimation in terms of dissatisfaction about the implemented policies or of a decisional stalemate.

How to analyze democratic quality
According to Morlino a good democracy is, first of all, a regime widely legitimized and stable, where citizens are fully satisfied because the elected rulers are capable and able to respond to their needs and questions (quality as result). If institutions are still challenged, attention, energy will be absorbed by the needs and objectives of its consolidation or maintenance. In addition, its citizens and communities enjoy freedom and equality beyond the minimum(quality as content). Third, citizens of a good democracy must be able to monitor and evaluate it through elections (electoral accountability) or indirectly (mutual control among the institutions) if and how the two values of freedom and equality are achieved through the full compliance with the current rules, the so-called rule of law, their efficient implementation, effectiveness in decision-making along with the political responsibility for the choices made by elected elites in relation to the questions raised by the civil society (quality as procedure ). Citizens, experts, scholars with different ideal conceptions of democracy can check which of the qualities listed above best suit their ideals and to what extent those qualities are implemented in a certain country at a certain time, using the empirical research conducted by Morlino.

Prizes and awards 
He has been awarded the Dartmouth Medal - Honorable Mention (Library Journal Best Reference 2011) for The International Encyclopedia of Political Science (Sage).

He holds Doctorates Honoris Causa from the Universidad Mayor de San Andrés (UMSA) (La Paz, Bolivia), the Universidad Nacional Mayor de San Marcos (Lima, Peru), the University of Bucharest (Bucharest, Romania).

He is the recipient of the Award for Scientific Achievements in Political Science by the Chilean Association of Political Science and of the Award for Academic Achievements and Contribution to the Development of Political Science by the Sociedad Argentina de Analisis Politico (Buenos Aires, Argentina).

He has been appointed Profesor Honorario of the Universidad Nacional de la Matanza (Buenos Aires, Argentina) and Honorary Member of Tunisian Association of Political Science, as well as life member of the International Political Science Association (IPSA) and of Mexican Association of Political Sciences (AMECIP).

He was conferred the title of Huespes de Honor of the city of Buenos Aires (Argentina) and Visitante Distinguido of the city of Puebla (Mexico).

Books 
 
 
 
 
 
 
 
 
Italian translation: 
 
 
 

 
 

  
 Morlino, Leonardo; Palombella, Gianluigi, eds. (2010) Rule of Law and Democracy. Brill: Leiden.

Journal articles (1991-2015)
 
 
 
 
 
 
  Pdf.
 
  Preview. Full text.
 
 
 
 
 
 
 
 
  Full text.
 
 
 
 
  Publisher.
 
 
 
 
 
 
 
 
 

 
 
 
 
 
 
 
 
 
  Also available at: Revistas Culturales.
 
 
 
  Pdf.
  Pdf.
 
 
  Also available at Rivisteweb.
  Publisher.
  Also available at Rivisteweb.
 
 
 
 
  Also available at Rivisteweb.
 
 
  Publisher. Pdf.

References

External links 

 Pdf of Can Democratic Innovations Improve the Quality of Democracy?, 2015
 Pdf of How to Assess Democracy in Latin America?, 2014
 Pdf of How to Assess a Democracy.What Alternatives?, 2014
 Pdf of What is a “Good” Democracy? Theory and Empirical Analysis, 2002

Living people
1947 births
Italian political scientists
Academic staff of the Libera Università Internazionale degli Studi Sociali Guido Carli
International Political Science Association scholars